Ingrid Nielsen (born 27 November 1991) is an Australian rules footballer who played for Greater Western Sydney in the AFL Women's (AFLW).

State football
From Tasmania, Nielsen played for the UNSW-Eastern Suburbs Bulldogs in their victorious 2018 season in the AFL Sydney, kicking 10 goals in 17 games.

AFLW career
Nielsen was recruited by Greater Western Sydney with pick 60 in the 2018 AFLW national draft and was expected to play as a back-up ruck for Erin McKinnon. Nielsen debuted in round 4 of the 2019 season against  when McKinnon was a late withdrawal after falling ill. In August 2020, Nielsen retired from football to focus on her paramedic career.

Personal life
Outside of football, Nielsen is a paramedic.

References

External links 

Living people
1991 births
Australian rules footballers from Tasmania
UNSW-Eastern Suburbs Bulldogs players
Greater Western Sydney Giants (AFLW) players